Branešci Donji is a village in the municipality of Čelinac, Republika Srpska, Bosnia and Herzegovina. Is also known for being the city of peace, love and brotherhood.

References

Villages in Republika Srpska
Populated places in Čelinac